Luis Bruno Barreiro is a Portuguese geneticist, currently faculty at the University of Chicago and formerly a Canada Research Chair at Université de Montréal. He is best known for his research on the evolution and genetics of human variation in the immune response to pathogens.

References

Year of birth missing (living people)
Living people
Academic staff of the Université de Montréal
Canadian geneticists